Diamond Bus Ltd., trading as Diamond West Midlands, is a bus operator in the West Midlands. It is a subsidiary of Rotala.

History

Birmingham Coach Company & Diamond Bus
In 1984 Geoff Howle commenced a coach operation trading as the Birmingham Coach Company. Following deregulation of the bus industry in 1986, Howle applied to operate route 16 between Hamstead and Birmingham in competition with West Midlands Travel. Other services subsequently operated included service 120 (now service 12) between Dudley and Birmingham and service 50 between Birmingham and Druids Heath. Service 16 and 50 are still operated by successor Diamond Bus. Buses used were predominately Leyland Nationals. From 3rd January 2023, service 16 will be renumbered 16A. 

In 2000 Birmingham Coach Company was re-branded as Diamond Bus, replacing many of their existing Leyland Nationals, expanding their network in Birmingham and the Black Country. By 2003 Diamond Bus had become a National Express contractor and opened a depot in Bradford.

Go West Midlands
In December 2005 the Go-Ahead Group purchased Diamond Bus and in February 2006 Probus Management with over 100 vehicles and merged the two companies to form Go West Midlands.

Rotala Group
In March 2008 Go West Midlands was sold to Rotala who also owned Central Connect and North Birmingham Busways. Rotala originally kept the Diamond business separate from Central Connect and Ludlows (purchased later), instead switching a number of routes between the three operators. From November 2011 Central Connect was re-branded as Blue Diamond.

Red Diamond & Black Diamond
In July 2008 new buses were put into service in Redditch on routes 57 and 58, branded as Red Diamond. Since then a number of routes in North Worcestershire have been re-branded as Red Diamond along with new routes in competition with First Midland Red's in Redditch. At the same time new buses were allocated to a number of Black Country routes, branded as Black Diamond. First Midland Red subsequently sold both its Redditch and Kidderminster depots to Diamond Bus.

Diamond Staffordshire
The Diamond Staffordshire brand was introduced in late 2012 for the company's services around the Lichfield area.

Following the purchase of Central Buses Diamond took on operations in Lichfield such as 35 to Walsall.  This service was subsequently taken over by Arriva Midlands and operated from their Wednesfield depot acquired with the purchase of Liyell Limited (t/a Midland) until operations from there were sold to Diamond Bus which brought Diamond back on to the 35 route.

The 35B service through Stonnall was scrapped in 2019 and replaced by 36 operated by Select Bus Services.

Diamond West Midlands
In late 2012 Blue Diamond, Black Diamond and Signature became Diamond West Midlands and operate services across the West Midlands.

Black Diamond

In 2008, upon takeover by Rotala, Diamond started to "localise" their operations. In the Black Country, this meant that the brand became Black Diamond with 20 new Plaxton Centros (eight of which moved to Wessex Bus due to service cuts). These were new for routes 401, 402, 404, 404E and 404H.

In 2009, Diamond launched eight more Plaxton Centro buses on route 9, these using Royale Black Diamond branding. Route 202 Halesowen - Bromsgrove and 4H Hayley Green - West Bromwich uses Royale Black Diamond buses.

Most of the routes these buses were new for have since either had new buses (404E), withdrawn (404/H) or had older stock transferred to them (401/2) .

In October 2010, Diamond bus branded 10 MCV Evolution bodied MAN 14.240s for the 404 Walsall – West Bromwich service under the branding Black Country Connection, the service operates every 6 to 8 minutes. These buses displaced the Black Diamond branded buses of which 2 were transferred to Wessex Bus and the rest have been cascaded to other routes, e.g. the 56 (which is now operated by National Express West Midlands as service 937).

On 23 April 2017 the Wednesfield operations of Arriva Midlands were purchased with nine vehicles.

On 28 July 2017, the business of Hanson's Local Buses that operated services in Stourbridge, Dudley and surrounding areas was purchased. Hanson's Local Buses was formed in the 1980s by Margaret Hanson as a coach operator. Following deregulation of the bus industry in 1986, Hansons diversified into operating bus services.

Blue Diamond
Blue Diamond was formed from the merger of Zak's Buses, North Birmingham Busways and Birmingham Motor Traction. In January 2008 Ludlows, Halesowen was purchased. Originally branded Central Connect, in November 2011 it was rebranded as Blue Diamond.

Blue Diamond, Red Diamond and Black Diamond branding have since been replaced by the simpler Diamond fleetname.

Signature

On 7 June 2010, Central Connect launched the Signature brand with two Solihull routes that were taken over from National Express West Midlands, the S2 (S2/S2A/S2C) and S3 were operated with Optare Solo SRs with leather seating and on-board WiFi.

On 26 July 2010, the Signature brand took over route 82 from National Express Coventry but following a more direct route between Solihull and  Coventry using Mercedes-Benz Citaros and service S4 (taken over from Grosvenor) using MCV Evolutions, again both feature leather seating and free on-board WiFi. In 2019, service 82 was lost to Johnson's of Henley-in-Arden who subsequently linked the service to their existing service X20 providing a direct service between Coventry,  Solihull and Stratford-upon-Avon.

On 27 March 2011, the Signature brand expanded again with the addition of route 30 Solihull-Acocks Green which was withdrawn by National Express West Midlands. This route is now operated by LandFlight as the A12.

When Central Connect was rebranded as 'Blue Diamond' in late 2011, the Solihull Signature brand was retained. Following loss of many contracts and reorganisation of bus routes in the Solihull area, the Signature brand was dropped in 2019.

In August 2021, the Diamond 32 service was withdrawn as the coordinated timetables on selected routes operated by Diamond and NXWM came to an end.  However, on 5 December 2021, the partnership was resumed along with service 32.

Diamond Worcestershire

In early 2013 Red Diamond was rebranded as Diamond Worcestershire.

In a working partnership with Worcestershire County Council, a new fleet of Red Diamond bus services were introduced to operate in Redditch. These buses are mainly Diamond owned Wright Eclipse bodied Volvo B7RLEs but there have been several re-painted Dennis Darts in operation.

From 22 January 2007, Diamond were forced to withdraw their evening services on routes 57 and 58 in Redditch, which were under contract to Worcestershire County Council, due to persistent vandalism and violence on the routes. The company told the council that they would no longer risk operating in the evenings. A month later on 25 February 2007, Diamond also withdrew the evening services on route 246 between Redditch and Evesham due to low passenger numbers.

On 8 June 2008, the company introduced 57A and 58A journeys alongside their existing 57 and 58 routes, the new journeys would serve the Alexandra Hospital, after First Midland Red withdrew links to the hospital.

The operations in Redditch were rebranded as Red Diamond in July 2008 to coincide with the launch of six new buses, with a livery designed to be similar to what was used on Midland Red buses. By September 2008 a further six new buses were in operation, along with 10 older buses in the new livery.

From 31 August 2008, Diamond Bus stepped up their operation of commercial and non-commercial services in Redditch significantly, to the point where they operated more buses in Redditch than main rival First Midland Red.

In February 2009, Red Diamond won Worcestershire County Council contracts to operate a number of services around Droitwich and Redditch starting in April 2009, these are routes 19 to Meadows Estate, 20 to Westlands, 20A to New Chawston, 137 to Dunhampstead, 140/141 to Bromsgrove and 157 to The Ridings. In addition to this, extra daytime journeys are to be provided on Redditch services 50, 64 and 70. The company will also once again operate evening services in Redditch on routes 55A, 56A, 57 and 58. Service 64 between Bromsgrove and Birmingham will also be renumbered to 144 and re-routed to follow the same numbered service operated by First. Droitwich residents were unhappy about the changes, showing concern about losing the known and respected drivers from the local routes, however, Diamond Bus entered into an agreement with the former operator of the routes, allowing them to continue operating with the same drivers, while Diamond Bus provide the buses and uniforms.

In 2010, amid much criticism of the poor performance of the existing buses from Worcestershire County Council and passengers, Diamond brought nine MCV Evolutions for services 362, 363 and 382.

In January 2013 Red Diamond purchased First Midlands's Kidderminster and Redditch depots and re-branded the operations as Diamond Worcestershire.

Acquisitions
After Rotala purchased Diamond Bus in 2008, the Diamond Bus operation was expanded to include the operations of four companies operating in the same region which were already owned by Rotala. It took many of the Arriva Midland routes such as 36 Walsall to Alumwell and 28E from Wolverhampton to Willenhall in April 2017.

Birmingham Motor Traction
Birmingham Motor Traction operated a number of services in Birmingham with a varied fleet of buses, mostly Dennis Darts in a dark blue and white livery, although many buses ran in dealer all-white. They operated a number of services under contract to the West Midlands Passenger Transport Executive. It was purchased by Rotala in 2007.

Central Buses
Central Buses was a bus company based in Birmingham, England. In February 2018, Central Buses was purchased by Rotala with its 23 services and 31 buses merged into Diamond. Operations ceased at the conclusion of services on 24 February 2018.

Hanson's

Hanson's was a family-owned bus company operating services in the West Midlands and Worcestershire. Hanson's Local Buses was formed in the 1980s by Margaret Hanson as a coach operator. Following deregulation of the bus industry in 1986, Hanson's diversified into operating bus services. In July 2017 it was purchased by Rotala.

Routes:
14-Brierley Hill To Fatherless Barn-Service was integrated into NXWMs 28 service from Stourbridge To Halesowen via Merry Hill in 2018.
20/21-Oldbury To Bearwood
24 Merry Hill To Foxyards-Service was subsequently taken over by NXWM in 2019 but Foxyards was withdrawn on this service.
55 Cape Hill To Brandhall-Service was withdrawn in 2019 and integrated with NXWM 54/A services. Following new tender awards in January 2023, Diamond have returned to operating certain of these services or their replacement route. For example the Stourbridge to Merry Hill section of service 28 has been replaced by an extension of existing service 142/142A creating a new service from Halesowen to Merry Hill via Stourbridge.

Ludlows
Ludlows operated a number of services in Halesowen. It operated a varied fleet of around 20 white buses, all of which were low-floor.
It was purchased by Rotala in 2007

In January 2009, Diamond announced that the Ludlows operation was to be integrated with the Diamond operations, with all routes and vehicles moving to the Tividale depot and running under the Diamond brand.

North Birmingham Busways
North Birmingham Busways was a small bus operator established in the mid-1990s, and based near Erdington. Its services operated throughout North Birmingham, using, in the main, a distinctive livery of green and cream.
In addition to bus services, the company also offered PCV training.

On 18 June 2007 it was purchased by Rotala. On 20 August 2007 the bus service operations and vehicles transferred to Rotala's Central Connect subsidiary.

Zak's
Zak's Bus and Coach Services was founded in Great Barr by Kevin Fazakarley in 1978. In October 2006 the business was purchased by Rotala subsidiary Flights Hallmark, and although the original plan was to transfer the assets and operations to Flights Hallmark, contract issues necessitated the continuation of the Zak's legal entity, the company being renamed Central Connect Limited in April 2007.

Rotala relocated the operation to Flights Hallmark's Aston depot, merging with an existing West Midlands Passenger Transport Executive contracted service previously awarded to Flights.  The Aston depot has since closed with all operations being moved to other Diamond Bus depots across the West Midlands.

Claribel Coaches

In January 2022, the purchase of Claribel Coaches of Birmingham was announced allowing the current owners to focus on the associated Birmingham International Coaches business. Diamond confirmed that the Claribels name would not be retained and all services and buses would be operated under the Diamond Bus name from April 2022. A number of routes, however, were transferred to National Express West Midlands due to the expiration of the tenders operated on behalf of TfWM.

Johnsons Excelbus

In April 2022, the bus operations of Johnsons Coaches, which operates under the Excelbus brand, were purchased. All bus operations will operate under the Diamond Bus brand from 29 May 2022 and will be operated from Redditch depot. The private hire and coach operations are not included in the deal and will continue to trade as Johnsons Coaches. Some Johnsons routes were started early "to assist Johnsons with some of their current operational difficulties".

Following loss of contracts in September 2022, a number of services operated by Johnsons were lost to other operators, chiefly Stagecoach.

References

External links
 
 Company website

Bus operators in the West Midlands (county)
Bus operators in Worcestershire
Rotala